The  is a series of double deck bridges connecting Okayama and Kagawa prefectures in Japan across a series of five small islands in the Seto Inland Sea. Built over the period 1978–88, it is one of the three routes of the Honshū–Shikoku Bridge Project connecting Honshū and Shikoku islands and the only one to carry rail traffic.

Crossing the bridge takes about 20 minutes by car or train. The ferry crossing before the bridge was built took about an hour.

The bridges carry two lanes of highway traffic in each direction (Seto-Chūō Expressway) on the upper deck and one railway track in each direction (Seto-Ōhashi Line) on the lower deck. The lower deck was designed to accommodate an additional set of Shinkansen tracks for a proposed extension of the Shinkansen to Shikoku.

History

When in 1889 the first railway in Shikoku was completed between Marugame and Kotohira, a member of the Prefectural Parliament, stated in his speech at the opening ceremony: "The four provinces of Shikoku are like so many remote islands. If united by roads, they will be much better off, enjoying the benefits of increased transportation and easier communication with each other."

While it took a century for this vision of a bridge across the Seto Inland Sea to become reality, another of Ōkubo's ideas, mentioned in a drinking song he composed, was accomplished twenty years sooner:
I'll tell you, dear, don't laugh at me,
a hundred years from now, I'll be seeing you 
flying to and from the moon in a space ship.
Its port, let me tell you, dear,
will be that mountaintop over there!

The bridge idea lay dormant for about sixty years. In 1955, after 171 people died when a ferry wrecked in dense fog off the coast of Takamatsu, a safer crossing was deemed necessary. By 1959, meetings were held to promote building the bridge. Scientists began investigations shortly after, and in 1970, the Honshu-Shikoku Bridge Construction Authority was inaugurated. However, work was postponed for five years by the "oil shock" of 1973; once the Environment Assessment Report was published in 1978, construction got underway. The ferry disaster also led to the creation of the Akashi Kaikyō Bridge.

The project took ten years to complete at a cost of US$7 billion;  of concrete and 705,000 tons of steel were used in construction. Although nets, ropes and other safety measures were employed, the lives of 13 workers were lost during the 10 years of construction. The bridge opened to road and rail traffic on April 10, 1988.

Constituent bridges

Six of the eleven bridges are separately named, unlike some other long bridge complexes such as the San Francisco–Oakland Bay Bridge. The other five bridges are viaducts. The six named bridges from north to south are listed below.

It is the 45th largest suspension bridge in the world. It is the northernmost bridge of the Seto-Chuo Expressway.
It is immediately north of the identical Iwakurojima Bridge.
It is immediately south of the identical Hitsuishijima Bridge.
It is immediately south of the Hitsuishijima and Iwakurojima Bridges.
Kita Bisan-Seto Bridge The  is a double-decked suspension bridge with two sections linked by a common anchorage between them. It is the 19th largest suspension bridge in the world. The nearly identical Minami Bisan Seto Bridge is located immediately to the south.
It is the 13th longest suspension bridge span in the world. It is the southernmost part of the Great Seto Bridge.

Sister bridges

 Golden Gate Bridge, San Francisco, California, United States
 Affiliated from April 5, 1988
 Fatih Sultan Mehmet Bridge, Istanbul, Turkey
 Affiliated from July 3, 1988
 Øresund Bridge, Malmo, Sweden and Copenhagen, Denmark
 Affiliated from May 24, 2008

See also
Honshū–Shikoku Bridge Project, three routes connecting Honshu and Shikoku
Akashi Kaikyō Bridge
 Kurushima Kaikyō Bridge
Tsing Ma Bridge, which has the longest road-rail span in the world
 List of largest suspension bridges
 List of largest cable-stayed bridges
 Mount Washu, viewpoint of the Great Seto Bridge

Notes

References

External links

Google Earth view of the strait between Shikoku and Honshu
Google Earth view of the Great Seto Bridge
Railway bridges in Japan
Suspension bridges in Japan
Cable-stayed bridges in Japan
Bridges completed in 1988
Truss bridges
Transport in Kagawa Prefecture
Transport in Okayama Prefecture
Buildings and structures in Kagawa Prefecture
Buildings and structures in Okayama Prefecture
Roads in Kagawa Prefecture
Roads in Okayama Prefecture
Toll bridges in Japan
1988 establishments in Japan
Road-rail bridges in Japan